"Shine On" is a song by German house trio R.I.O. The song was written by Yann Peifer, Manuel Reuter and Andres Ballinas. It was released in Germany as a digital download on 6 August 2008.

Track listing
Digital download
 "Shine On" (Radio Mix) – 3:23
 "Shine On" (Spencer & Hill Radio Edit) – 3:02
 "Shine On" (Soft House Radio Mix) – 3:21
 "Shine On" (Mondo Radio Edit) – 3:21
 "Shine On" – 6:03
 "Shine On" (Extended Mix) – 6:05
 "Shine On" (Spencer & Hill Remix) – 6:18
 "Shine On" (Soft House Mix) – 5:36
 "Shine On" (Mondo Remix) – 5:53

Credits and personnel
Lead vocals – Tony T.
Producers – Yann Peifer, Manuel Reuter
Lyrics – Yann Peifer, Manuel Reuter, Andres Ballinas
Label: Zooland Records

Charts

Weekly charts

Year-end charts

Release history

References

2008 singles
R.I.O. songs
2008 songs
Songs written by DJ Manian
Songs written by Yanou
Songs written by Andres Ballinas
Number-one singles in Israel